The 2019 U Sports Women's Volleyball Championship was held March 15–17, 2019, in Edmonton, Alberta, to determine a national champion for the 2018–19 U Sports women's volleyball season. The tournament was played at Saville Community Sports Centre at the University of Alberta. It was the sixth time that Alberta had hosted the tournament with the most recent occurring in 2010.

The eighth-seeded UBC Thunderbirds overcame a two-set deficit in the championship match to defeat the defending champion Ryerson Rams three sets to two to win the 12th championship in program history. It was the first time in U Sports women's volleyball history that a team seeded eighth had won the national championship.

Participating teams

Championship bracket

Consolation bracket

Awards

Championship awards 
 CIS Championship MVP – Kiera Van Ryk, UBC
 R.W. Pugh Fair Play Award – Brie O’Reilly, Trinity Western

All-Star Team 
Olivia Furlan, UBC
Kiera Van Ryk, UBC
Tessa Davis, UBC
Theanna Vernon, Ryerson
Lauren Veltman, Ryerson
Kory White, Alberta
Courtney Baker, Dalhousie

References

External links 
 Tournament Web Site

U Sports volleyball
2019 in women's volleyball
University of Alberta